Konrad Adolf Hallenstein, also Conrad Hallenstein (15 January 1835 – 28 September 1892) was a German actor.

Life and career 
Born in Frankfurt, Hallenstein was the son of director and farce poet Ernst Hallenstein (d. 1881). He received his acting training in Frankfurt and Hamburg before he made his debut at the Frankfurter Stadttheater in the role of Raoul in The Maid of Orleans in 1852. After that Hallenstein played in 1856 in Hamburg, in 1857 in Königsberg and in 1858 in Aachen. He was a member of the Estates Theatre (Königlichen Landestheater resp. The "Königlich deutschen Landestheater") in Prague Franz Thomé being director, but also gave guest performances in other cities (Frankfurt, Graz, Dresden, Berlin, Vienna).

Hallenstein belonged from 3 May 1871 until 13 November 1890 to the Burgtheater in Vienna. He performed a total of 156 days in 1877. He took part both in the farewell performance in 1888 in the old house of the Burgtheater (in the role of King Thoas in Goethe's Iphigenia in Tauris) and in the first performance in the new house of the Burgtheater on 14 October.

From 1859, under the name Höllenstein das Tausendguldenkraut in Prague, Hallenstein was one of the founders of the Schlaraffia. In Vienna he was one of the co-founders of the Schlaraffia Vindobona in 1877.

In 1890 Hallenstein retired because of "weakness of memory" and moved, hoping to alleviate his suffering, to Baden bei Wien in a villa built according to his order (Helenenstraße 20).

On 27 September 1892, the K-k Hofburg actor went completely insane and had to be brought to the private sanatorium of Dr. Löwy in Purkersdorf where he died a day later at age 57. He was buried on 30 September of that year at the Matzleinsdorf Protestant Cemetery (Group 24, No. 35) in Vienna.

Honours 
 k.k. Hofschauspieler (1876)
 Knight's Cross of the Order of Franz Joseph (1890)

Further reading 
 .
 Ludwig Eisenberg: Das geistige Wien. Künstler- und Schriftstellerlexikon. 1889 ff.
 Ludwig Eisenberg: Großes biographisches Lexikon der Deutschen Bühne im XIX. Jahrhundert. Verlag von Paul List, Leipzig 1903, p. 388,.
 Wilhelm Kosch: Deutsches Theater-Lexikon. Biographisches und bibliographisches Handbuch. Band 1: A– Hurk. de Gruyter, Berlin 1953.
 
 Felix Czeike: Historisches Lexikon Wien. Volume 3: Ha–La. Kremayr & Scheriau, Vienna 2004, .

References

Notes 

19th-century German male actors
German male stage actors
Knights of the Order of Franz Joseph
1835 births
1892 deaths
Actors from Frankfurt